

Review and events

Pre–2015 
On 11 December 2014, Mitra Kukar announced that Scott Cooper had been appointed as the new manager for the 2015 season. Cooper will start to actively handle Mitra Kukar on January 1, 2015. Cooper will be contracted for two seasons with Mitra Kukar

Matches

Legend

Friendlies

Indonesia Super League

Piala Indonesia

Statistics

Squad 
.

                         

|}

Transfers

In

Out

References

External links 
Official site

Mitra Kukar FC
Mitra Kukar FC